The pallid pearlfish, Pyramodon ventralis, is a pearlfish of the family Carapidae, found in the Indo-western Pacific Ocean at depths between 100 and 400 m.  Its length is between 25 and 30 cm.

References
 
 Tony Ayling & Geoffrey Cox, Collins Guide to the Sea Fishes of New Zealand,  (William Collins Publishers Ltd, Auckland, New Zealand 1982) 

Carapidae
Fish described in 1913